Johan Vilhelm Andersen (17 January 1892 – 29 November 1971) was a Danish painter. His work was part of the painting event in the art competition at the 1924 Summer Olympics. He studied at the Royal Danish Academy of Fine Arts.

References

1892 births
1971 deaths
19th-century Danish painters
20th-century Danish painters
Danish male painters
Olympic competitors in art competitions
People from Copenhagen
19th-century Danish male artists
20th-century Danish male artists